Moths of Burkina Faso represent about 68 known moth species. The moths (mostly nocturnal) and butterflies (mostly diurnal) together make up the taxonomic order Lepidoptera.

This is a list of moth species which have been recorded in Burkina Faso.

Arctiidae
Amerila niveivitrea (Bartel, 1903)
Creatonotos leucanioides Holland, 1893
Cyana klausruedigerbecki Karisch, 2005

Lasiocampidae
Euphorea ondulosa (Conte, 1909)
Morongea elfiora Zolotuhin & Prozorov, 2010
Odontocheilopteryx haribda Gurkovich & Zolotuhin, 2009
Odontocheilopteryx maculata Aurivillius, 1905
Odontocheilopteryx pattersoni Tams, 1926
Opisthodontia afroio Zolotuhin & Prozorov, 2010
Opisthodontia sidha Zolotuhin & Prozorov, 2010
Stenophatna hollandi (Tams, 1929)
Theophasida cardinalli (Tams, 1926)

Lymantriidae
Otroeda hesperia (Cramer, 1779)

Metarbelidae
Moyencharia herhausi  Lehmann, 2013 
Moyencharia ochreicosta  (Gaede, 1929)

Noctuidae
Abrostola confusa Dufay, 1958
Achaea mercatoria (Fabricius, 1775)
Acontia esperiana Hacker, Legrain & Fibiger, 2010
Acontia insocia (Walker, 1857)
Acontia nigrimacula Hacker, Legrain & Fibiger, 2008
Acontia wahlbergi Wallengren, 1856
Argyrogramma signata (Fabricius, 1775)
Aspidifrontia hemileuca (Hampson, 1909)
Aspidifrontia villiersi (Laporte, 1972)
Attatha metaleuca Hampson, 1913
Audea paulumnodosa Kühne, 2005
Brevipecten confluens Hampson, 1926
Brevipecten politzari Hacker & Fibiger, 2007
Cerocala albicornis Berio, 1966
Cerocala caelata Karsch, 1896
Chasmina vestae (Guenée, 1852)
Chrysodeixis acuta (Walker, [1858])
Chrysodeixis chalcites (Esper, 1789)
Crypsotidia maculifera (Staudinger, 1898)
Crypsotidia mesosema Hampson, 1913
Diparopsis watersi (Rothschild, 1901)
Eublemma ragusana (Freyer, 1844)
Eublemma tytrocoides Hacker & Hausmann, 2010
Eutelia polychorda Hampson, 1902
Grammodes congenita Walker, 1858
Hypotacha ochribasalis (Hampson, 1896)
Marathyssa cuneata (Saalmüller, 1891)
Masalia nubila (Hampson, 1903)
Parachalciope benitensis (Holland, 1894)
Polytela cliens (Felder & Rogenhofer, 1874)
Polytelodes florifera (Walker, 1858)
Rhabdophera arefacta (Swinhoe, 1884)
Rhabdophera clathrum (Guenée, 1852)
Rhabdophera hansali (Felder & Rogenhofer, 1874)
Saalmuellerana media (Walker, 1857)
Tachosa fumata (Wallengren, 1860)
Thiacidas meii Hacker & Zilli, 2007
Thiacidas mukim (Berio, 1977)
Thiacidas politzari Hacker & Zilli, 2010
Thiacidas stassarti Hacker & Zilli, 2007
Ulotrichopus tinctipennis (Hampson, 1902)

Nolidae
Xanthodes brunnescens (Pinhey, 1968)

Pyralidae
Lepipaschia limbata Shaffer & Solis, 1994

Saturniidae
Gynanisa jama Rebel, 1915
Holocerina angulata (Aurivillius, 1893)
Holocerina istsariensis Stoneham, 1962
Micragone rougeriei Bouyer, 2008
Usta terpsichore (Maassen & Weymer, 1885)

Sphingidae
Ceridia heuglini (C. & R. Felder, 1874)

References

External links 
 AfroMoths

Burk
Moths
Burkina
Burkina Faso